The List of shipwrecks in 1748 includes some ships sunk, wrecked or otherwise lost during 1748.

Early 1748 (N.S.)
Prior to 1752, when the Calendar Act set 1 January as the beginning of the New Year in the British Empire, Britain and its colonies observed the first day of the new year on 25 March.  For those wrecks that happened in what would now be considered January, February and March 1748 under the calendar system used all over the world, bur which was considered January, February and March of "1747" on the archaic calendar, please refer to their unusual placement in the latter sections of the article List of shipwrecks in 1747.

April
1748 did not begin on 1 January! (except in non-British nations such as Spain, Portugal, France, Poland, Italy, where 1748 began on 1 January.  Under the old system abandoned by Britain more than 275 years ago, the year 1748 officially began on 25 March.

Unknown date

May

18 May

27 May

Unknown date

June

26 June

July

24 July

August

Unknown date

September

14 September

Unknown date

October

11 October

24 October

25 October

Unknown date

November

Unknown date

December

1 December

8 December

14 December

17 December

26 December

31 December

Unknown date

January

5 January

14 January

16 January

17 January

27 January

Unknown date

February

1 February

22 February

Unknown date

March

Unknown date

Unknown date

Notes
 Until 1752, the year began on Lady Day (25 March) Thus 24 March 1747 was followed by 25 March 1748. 31 December 1748 was followed by 1 January 1748.

References

1748